Le Faouët is a commune in the Morbihan department of the region of Brittany in north-western France.

The sixteenth century timber market halls are a noted feature of the town and two medieval chapels lies within the boundaries of the commune.

Toponymy

Faoued (french, Faouët) is a breton word meaning beech forest.

Geography

It lies in the historical region of Cornouaille. Traditionally a Breton-speaking area, the French language became commonly used from the 1950s. The town lies in the valley of the river Ellé. The river Ellé forms the commune's eastern border. The river Inam forms the commune's western border and flows into the river Ellé. Apart from the town, there are about one hundred and twenty hamlets and isolated farms. In the center of the town stands the sixteenth century timber market halls.

Map

List of places

History

The oldest surviving parish registers date back to 1544. An infamous historical resident of Le Faouët is Marion du Faouët, the head of an eighteenth-century group of bandits who became a local bogeyman after her death.

Administration
Until 2015, Le Faouët/Ar Faoued was the seat of the canton of Le Faouët, that consisted of 6 communes. Since the 2015 canton reorganisation, it is part of the canton of Gourin.

Demographics

Inhabitants of Le Faouët are called Faouëtais.

Breton language
In 2008, 14,24% of the children attended the bilingual schools in primary education.

Tourist attractions

The sixteenth century halles, or covered market, remain in use and are a rare surviving example of a large timber structure from the period.

The chapel of Saint Barbara is sited on a hilltop overlooking the Ellé. The fifteenth century chapel of Saint Fiacre was recently restored. The polychrome timber interior was highly regarded, and earned its creator, Olivier Le Loergan, a title of nobility. The stained glass is also noteworthy. Parts of the interior have suffered considerable damage from insects.

See also
Communes of the Morbihan department
List of the works of the Maître de Lanrivain
Henri Alphonse Barnoin

References

External links

Communes of Morbihan